The Federation Cup 1995–96 was the second and last edition of the IIHF Federation Cup. The season started on October 6, 1995, and finished on December 29, 1995.

The tournament was won by AS Mastini Varese, who beat Metallurg Magnitogorsk in the final.

Preliminary round

Group A *

Group A Participants
 Alba Volán Székesfehérvár,
 HK Solvita Kaunas,
 KHK Crvena zvezda,
 SC Miercurea Ciuc

Group A Winner
 SC Miercurea Ciuc

*: Scheduled group did not take place, SC Miercurea Ciuc qualification criteria were unclear.

Group B
(Jesenice, Slovenia)

First stage

Group C
(Riga, Latvia)

Group C Semifinals

Group C Third Place

Group C Final

Group D
(Oświęcim, Poland)

Group B Semifinals

Group D Third Place

Group D Final

Group E
(Varese, Italy)

Group E Semifinals

Group E Third Place

Group E Final

 HK Dukla Trenčín    :  bye

Final stage
(Trenčín, Slovakia)

Semifinals

Third place match

Final

References
 Federation Cup 1996

Fed
IIHF Federation Cup